Pierre Mauroy (5 July 1928 – 7 June 2013) was a French Socialist politician who was Prime Minister of France from 1981 to 1984 under President François Mitterrand. Mauroy also served as Mayor of Lille from 1973 to 2001. At the time of his death Mauroy was the emeritus mayor of the city of Lille. He died from complications of lung cancer on 7 June 2013 at the age of 84. He is the namesake of Lille's new stadium, Stade Pierre-Mauroy.

Biography

Background
Mauroy was born in Cartignies. A teacher, he led the Socialist Youth Movement and the Technical Teaching Union in the 1950s. He became a leading figure in the Socialist federation of Nord département, which was among the third biggest of the French Section of the Workers' International (SFIO) party and climbed quickly in the party. In 1966, he became the second most powerful person of the party behind the secretary general, Guy Mollet. Nevertheless, when Mollet resigned as leader in 1969, Alain Savary was chosen to succeed him.

Political career
After the electoral disasters of 1968 and 1969, he was persuaded of the necessity to renew the party. In 1971, during the Epinay Congress, he supported François Mitterrand's election to the party leadership and became the second most powerful person in the Socialist Party (PS). Two years later, he was elected as a deputy and Mayor of Lille.

Increasingly, Mauroy criticized the replacement of former SFIO members from important positions by allies of Mitterrand. In this, he formed an alliance with Michel Rocard, the main opponent of Mitterrand, during the 1979 Metz Congress. However, Mitterrand chose him as spokesperson during the 1981 presidential campaign; after Mitterrand's election, he appointed Mauroy as Prime Minister.

Prime Minister
Mauroy's government was a radical reforming one, implementing a wide range of social reforms including the reduction of the legal workweek from 40 to 39 hours, the limiting of continuous shift working to an average of no more than 35 hours per week, the lowering of the retirement age to 60, and a rise in social welfare benefits. Entitlement to paid holidays was also extended from four to five weeks. During the Mauroy government's first year in office, minimum pensions were increased by 38%, rent allowances by 50%, family allowances by 25% (50% for households with two children), and the minimum wage by 25%.

During the 1981–82 period, state industrial investment was substantially increased, 17 billion francs in ”soft loan" credit was provided to private industry, 7 billion francs was set aside to help school leavers, 54,000 new civil service jobs were created, and a major housebuilding drive was launched. Efforts were made to shift the burden of direct taxes away from lower- income groups, while increases in the minimum wage gave the low paid a real increase in their living standards of about 15% in 1981–82. Unemployment benefits were also increased, together with the duration of time in which one could receive them. In addition, the maximum allowable workweek was reduced from 50 to 48 hours.

Upon taking office, the Mauroy Government embarked upon an ambitious redistributive programme. The minimum wage went up in real terms by 11% between May 1981 and September 1982, while the minimum old age pension was increased by 30%. 800,000 elderly people were exempted from paying T.V. licenses, while 1.5 million were also exempted from local taxes. Between May 1981 and January 1983, family benefits were significantly increased, with the purchasing power of the 2,700,000 families with two children raised by 40%. These policies significantly improved the living standards of the less well off in French society, with poverty reduced during Mauroy's term in office. Family allowances were increased by 81% for families with two children and by 49% for families with three children, while old-age pensions were raised by 300 francs a month for a single person and 3,700 francs for a couple.

Altogether, the purchasing power of social transfers went up by 45% in 1981 and by 7.6% in 1982. Health care coverage was also extended, with health insurance benefits made more widely available to part-time employees and the unemployed. Efforts were also made to promote voluntary retirement at sixty, with a pension ranging upwards from 80% of the SMIC (fr) to 50% of a middle-management salary. In 1982, two measures were introduced that extended eligibility for early retirement for workers aged 55 to 59: the contrats de préretraites progressives and the contrats de solidarité-démission. These programmes were aimed at stimulating consumption and aggregate demand by providing firms with incentives to hire younger workers as replacements for early retirees. A year later, "solidarity contracts" were introduced which provided early retirement for older workers aged 55 or above on the condition that firms replace recipients with younger workers. Elderly people benefited greatly from the social and economic measures undertaken by the Mauroy Government, with the real income of pensioners rising by a quarter.

Harsh immigration statutes introduced during the presidency of Valéry Giscard d'Estaing were reversed, while an immigration law was passed (1981) to limit the grounds for expelling foreigners to facilitate family reunions and amnesty 130,000 illegal immigrants. A 1982 law introduced new rights for helper spouses, while the anti-discriminatory Professional Equality Law (1983), which defined equality between men and women "in sweeping terms," required all businesses to furnish statistics on the situation of women in the workplace. This legislation marked a new departure in anti-discriminatory efforts and, reinforced by a series of measures taken by the Rocard government in 1989, brought an end to wage differentials hidden by different job descriptions. Decentralising laws were also passed which transferred responsibilities for urban planning to municipalities and economic planning to the regions. In addition, various measures were introduced to improve socio-economic conditions in low-income neighbourhoods. Aid for the improvement of older HLM housing was increased, with the allocation for 1982 being about 40% higher than in 1981. A guiding law about domestic transport enacted in 1982 stipulated “that the government needs to provide reasonably priced public transport for all citizens.” In 1983 a new minimum contributory pension was introduced “with increments according to the number of children,” a collaborative 'interministerial' approach to employment and the social rehabilitation of 'at risk' youth was adopted, and in 1983 the Banlieue 89 project was instigated for social and educational measures on estates in the educational priority areas. As a result of such policies, urban grants (as a proportion of local authority revenues) significantly increased during the first three years of the Mitterrand presidency, especially in municipalities controlled by the Left. In 1982, the Missions locales pour l’insertion professionnelle et sociale des jeunes were established, local advice centres that targeted young people (essentially in the 16-25 age group) experiencing major difficulties in finding work. A military reform law, passed in July 1983, enabled those who were opposed to the usage of arms on grounds of conscience to be accepted for civilian service.

An Ordinance of February 1982 limited the duration of fixed-term contracts to 6 to 12 months, and introduced an end of contract bonus of 5% total gross pay over the contract's period. Another Ordinance passed that same month restricted the duration of assignments to 6 months, and increased the 'precarious employment allowance' from 4% to 15% of gross pay per assignment. For public sector workers, a law was passed in 1982 to prevent gender segregation in recruitment and to ensure that the situation was monitored carefully. Under a law of May the 7th 1982 “civil service jobs previously closed to women had been opened to them.” Under the 1983 finance law, abolished “the notion of head of family that had been preserved in the tax law” was abolished and both spouses “must now sign a joint income tax return.”

An Act of July 1982 allowed the spouses of shopkeepers and artisans to receive social or work-related entitlements. An Act of August 1982 raised employers' participation in financing the public transportation expenses of employees. In April 1982 special aids were extended to farmers who had invested between 1 April 1981 and 31 March 1982.

Pursuant to its campaign pledges, the Mauroy Government established 14,760 new permanent teaching posts at the elementary and secondary levels in June 1981, and provided for 16,800 more in the 1982 budget and an additional 8,370 in the 1983 budget. A major increase in the modest salaries of elementary school teachers was announced. Technical education at the secondary level was declared to be a priority area, with special attention in the form of more scholarship money, additional teaching positions, and the commitment of 430 million francs per year for three years for the introduction of new technologies into the school programme. However, these actions (particularly the creation of only 400 new technical teachers' positions in 1981, when enrolment went up by 11,000) were seen as inadequate by the National Union of Technical Education-Autonomous Apprenticeship. In December 1981, a general science programme in the eleventh grade (premier) was created to replace the mathematics programme (the Bac C) which, after the fall from favour of Latin and Greek, had come to be known as a "royal road into élitist schools and careers". The Premier S programme was an attempt to postpone definitive scholastic and social segregation, and also to reduce the importance of mathematical aptitude as the primary criterion for selection into élite schools. Greater funds were allocated to education, with the education budget was increased by 17.3% in 1982 and by 15% in 1983. In 1981–82, as a means of tackling cases of education failure, the Ministry of Education subsidized projects designed to help weaker students in 4,500 of the country's 7,300 secondary schools. Although these subsidies were only of 30 million francs, the programme encouraged secondary schools to pay attention to the problem. They were heaviest in designated priority education and action zones.

In 1981, Educational Priority Zones were set up to provide additional resources to schools in depressed areas and to combat academic failure. The 1982 budget increased spending on education by 17%, while the 1983 budget provided tenure for 14,399 "auxiliariat", teachers were only employed on a casual basis. A decree of June 1982 established a commission for public education staff training (or MAFPEN) in each "académie," while CPR (or "regional teacher training centre", which were established in 1952) training placements were extended to 8–9 hours a week. That same year, the Delegation for Training and Research in Education was set up to coordinate the activities of the MAFPENs.

The outgoing centre-right government was perceived to have harassed university assistants, the most junior faculty rank, by publicly questioning their qualifications, by increasing the teaching load of those who had not completed doctoral theses, and by limiting prospects for promotion and tenure. In May 1982, after several unions and associations announced a strike of assistants to call attention to their unmet grievances, the new education minister Alain Savary assured union leaders that all assistants who wished to continue a university career would be granted tenure. Promotion would be facilitated by the establishment of a thousand new maitre-assistant post per year for 4 years. In April 1982, following several demonstrations and strikes by the National Associations of Assistants (ANA), 2000 new tenured assistant positions were created.

Government decrees of September and October 1982 introduced various reforms aimed at making entry to the National School of Administration (or ENA) more accessible to a wider range of French society. The age limit was raised to enable less favoured candidates to catch up on career advancement, the element in the entrance examination for "general culture" (which had proven advantageous to upper-class applicants) was reduced, students from other grandes ecoles were prevented from making claims that they were already civil servants when they applied to the National School of Administration, and a rule of parity between students and lower civil servants among candidates for admission to the ENA was established. In addition, a law of January 1983 introduced a third route of access to the National School of Administration, reserved for those who had held important posts in mutual aid societies, voluntary associations, and trade unions for a period of at least eight years, and extended this opportunity to certain local elected officials.

The Auroux laws (1982) increased the rights of trade unions and employees in the workplace, covering collective bargaining, representation, information, health and safety, and unfair dismissal. The Auroux Laws included a requirement that half of all overtime worked in excess of 130 hours per year must be compensated by additional time off, while trade union delegates became entitled to an increase in paid time off for union activities and to increased protection against dismissal. In addition, an Auroux Law of November 1982 established an obligation to negotiate real wages and hours once a year at the level of the firm, and to negotiate real wages once a year and to revise job classifications once every five years at the national industry level. Mandatory collective bargaining at the firm level of industry was introduced, while the laws also strengthened the rules on health and safety in the workplace, bestowing more rights upon the Comites d’hygiene et securite (though not the right to stop production in case of extreme danger), while also granting working-class representatives release time, training for involvement in the comite d’entreprise and other representative bodies in the firm, recourse to expert consultants. Unions acquired rights to organise, to hold meetings in firms, and to call in outside speakers to address the workers. Worker representation on the comite d’rentreprise was increased and the comite was provided with additional powers, such as the right to obtain confidential economic information from the firm to use in advising it on policy. In spite of these positive changes, however, the comite d'entreprise remained a consultative body with little influence on economic policy, while only large firms were required to provide their comite d’enterprises with economic information. This meant that almost two-thirds of the workers were excluded from exercising this oversight function.

A government decree of March 1982 sought to provide greater employment security for the increasing number of workers on part-time and fixed-term contracts by restricting the circumstances in which employers could use such labour (this was largely to ensure that permanent employees were not displaced by cheaper and more easily dismissed part-time workers). The law set out to ensure that such workers receive the same benefits as full-time workers and trade unions were given statutory rights to institute legal proceedings against employers or temporary work agencies if the provisions of the new law were evaded. That same year, the government passed legislation to ensure the full, legal eligibility of women for all civil service posts and an active policy was adopted to encourage them to come forward for promotion. In 1981, legislation was passed which permitted the establishment of local private radio stations. In March 1982, a "Special Statute" was granted to Corsica, which set the territory apart legally from other regions and provided it with additional state subsidies and greater autonomy over cultural, social, economic, and educational policies. Various measures were also introduced to improve conditions for migrants. A new drive began in 1981 to encourage local authorities to establish programmes including literacy programmes, housing schemes, and the setting up of young people's and women's groups, and in 1983 France ratified the Council of Europe's Convention on the Legal Status of Migrant Workers. The Association Law of 1981 allowed foreigners for the first time to form associations in France under the same rules that governed citizens, and these new immigrant associations were thereafter eligible to receive public funding. New policies removed the French language requirements of immigrants to run for seats in employee institutions, and foreign workers became eligible for the first time to sit on important industrial relations councils known as the Conseils des Prud’hommes. In 1982, an existing programme to assist the repatriation of Algerian nationals was replaced by a system offering a choice between vocational training, assistance to set up a small business and a repatriation grant.

Decrees were made in January 1982 concerning official recognition of persons and bodies responsible for noise monitoring, the monitoring of carbon monoxide and benzene levels in the atmosphere at workplaces, and the inspection of electrical installations. A decree issued in February 1982 laid down safety measures to be taken against electrical hazards arising during the construction, operation and maintenance of electric power distribution installations. A decree issued by the Minister of Labour in March 1982 specified the offices responsible for carrying out the technical tests on particularly dangerous machinery (listed in a decree of April 1981) which are required before the machinery can be officially approved. It also specified the information to be provided by the person applying for official approval. A decree of May 1982 contained provisions on the setting up, restructuring, organization, financing and tasks of occupational health services in agricultural undertakings and listed those agricultural undertakings for which special medical surveillance is required. Another decree, made that same month, contained new regulations governing health, safety and preventive health measures in public undertakings. It laid down detailed health and safety requirements and specified how these were to be met. It also contained provisions on training in the area, medical surveillance, and health and safety services. Two Orders of July 1982 amended the rules applicable to fixed-term contracts and temporary work with the intention of restricting the use of casual labour and improving the living and working conditions of workers in insecure jobs. A law of July 1982 concerning the spouses of craftsmen and tradesmen employed in the family business amended the provisions of the labour code, social security system, civil code and company law to establish an occupational status for this group of people. In June 1982, a new popular savings book paying index-linked interest was introduced, under which Individuals domiciled for tax purposes in France and whose tax liability was under FF 1 000 were entitled to hold a maximum of FF 10000 (FF 20000 for households) savings in that scheme. Also in 1982, holidays for the low-paid were encouraged by an extension of holiday Vouchers (Cheques-Vacances), subsidized by the employer and requiring regular saving out of earnings. A banking law of January 1984 entitled individuals lacking current accounts who had been refused by three banks to ask the Bank of France to designate a bank or the postal bank to provide them with free accounts.

An Act of January 1984 asserted a right for all parents to benefit from a parental leave of absence for childrearing, providing that they have one year's seniority. This legislation also allowed parents (under the same conditions) to request part-time work and to shift freely between part-time work and parental leave. In 1982, the law governing the age of consent for homosexual activity was reduced from 18 to 15 years to match the age of consent for heterosexual activity. For those with disabilities, a 1982 law on urban transport reform stated that special measures must be taken to accommodate the special needs of people with limited mobility. A law passed on 9 July 1984 provided that a worker with at least two years' service must receive a redundancy payment based on gross earnings prior to termination of the work contract. The law further provided that workers aged 60 or above who voluntarily left the firm would receive a retirement severance grant.

Various measures were also undertaken to encourage research. Higher spending was allocated to research, while the directors of the various research councils were changed and a series of regional colloquia set up, which culminated in a national "assises" of researchers, where some 3,000 met in Paris to establish guidelines for future research policy. A law was passed that allowed researchers in universities and agencies to sign contracts with industry. CESTA, an agency for evaluating new fields of science and technology, was established, while more money was allocate to ANVAR, the national agency for promoting the application of basic research.

To safeguard workers from exposure to dangerous substances and agents, three Orders containing
the lists and the conditions for the labelling and packaging of dangerous substances (10 October 1983), of dangerous preparations solvents (11 October 1983) and of paints, varnishes, printing inks, glues and similar products (12 October 1983) gave effect to the corresponding EEC Directives under national legislation. A circular implementing these three Orders was issued in January 1984 and the substances and preparations not included in these orders were
covered by a circular on 4 July 1984. A circular of July 1982 on maximum concentrations was supplemented by two others, dated December 1983 and May 1984, with a view to the introduction of EEC Directive 80-1107 November 1980 on the protection of workers from exposure to chemical, physical and biological agents at work.

A law on worker's democracy in public-sector companies was passed in July 1983 which sought to recreate a spirit of tripartism in a sector of the economy where existing statutory rights had failed to provide anything more than a consultative role for representatives. Previously, workers had the right to be represented on the boards of public sector companies with 50 or more staff and were entitled to at least 2 board seats, but under the new legislation, public sector companies (previously nationalized companies plus those companies that were nationalized in 1982 in which the state was the majority shareholder) would be obliged to have tripartite administrative or supervisory boards to which employee representatives would be elected by the workforce. A couple of autogestionary measures were also introduced. One measure involved workers' representation on the administrative councils of the nationalized industries, under which one-third of the members of these councils being drawn from the workforce. The other measure involved elections to the administrative commissions for social security, under which 15 and 25 members of these commissions were chosen through elections among those who were insured by the fund.

A law on vocational training in February 1984 established employment contracts for six months for further training on the job while taking courses. These included the contrats de qualification, the contrats d’adaptation, ranging from 6 to 24 months, and a 3 to 6-month programme known as the stages d’initiation a la vie professionnelle, which was designed to familiarise young people with factory and firm. A 1983 law on apprenticeships laid down the principle that apprenticeship is a method of giving young workers having completed schooling a general theoretical and practical training, for the purpose of acquiring professional qualifications leading to technology diplomas. The law laid down a number of general rules on apprenticeship. Training is organised on the basis of alternation, part in industry, and part in the
apprenticeship centre, while a contractual relationship must be created between the apprentice and the employer, by means of an apprenticeship contract. A higher education law of 1983 restored democratic representation on university councils and granted the universities greater autonomy and more power to conduct research and to make contacts with industry.

A decree of 23 March 1982 listed the offices responsible for testing lifting equipment other than lifts and building-site hoists, while a decree issued in May that same year 1982 extended its provisions to agriculture. Under a decree of 31 March 1982, the general health and safety regulations for dangerous machinery and appliances were extended to include portable hand-operated machinery and appliances. Exceptions for certain less dangerous appliances were laid down in a decree of June 1982. In regards to the agricultural sector, a decree of 8 March 1982 laid down the conditions attached to the approval of electrical installations in agricultural undertakings and specified which offices are authorized to test these installations. In 1983, leave was introduced for setting up businesses and sabbatical leave for wage-earners, and in June that year, a law was passed that completed the incorporation into French Law of a 1977 European Council Directive on the approximation of the laws of the Member States relating to the safeguarding of employees' rights in the event of transfers of undertakings, businesses or parts of businesses.

The Deferre Law reduced the powers of the prefect, set up elected regional councils, and increased the powers of local government. The security court was abolished, and measures were introduced to control police harassment. Legal aid was extended, legislation was introduced which effectively combated discrimination against homosexuals, and the traditional powers of the juge d’instruction in the preparation of criminal cases was reduced. The Quillot Law of 1982 provided renters with additional rights in housing matters, while an audiovisual law passed that same year brought an end to the state monopoly of audiovisual broadcasting and established a High Authority to guarantee the independence of public television channels. Laws were passed in 1982 to reform higher education to make the academy more responsive to the needs of the state. High security wings in prisons were abolished, while social security reform increased workers' representation on the bodies that oversaw the management of the social security schemes. In order to make the elite political academy (the ENA) accessible to a wider section of the population, a special entry pathway was established for those who had held trade union or political office. A new health care policy was implemented, which included the abolition of private beds in hospitals, reform of medical training, modernisation of facilities, and the election of the heads of medical services by the entire staff, rather than just by doctors, as had previously been the case. The Mauroy Government also withdrew a ministerial circular issued by the previous government that limited initiatives by regional councils, while a grant was created for the purpose of subsidizing local cultural projects and activities.

The Mauroy Government did much to promote arts, culture, and education, as characterised by a tripling in real terms in state aid to the arts, a quadrupling of spending on public libraries, which led to the number of library loans growing by a third, and the removal of obstacles to cheaper book-retailing. Aid was provided to provincial art museums and local archives for working-class affairs established, while funding to provincial libraries was significantly increased, with the national library budget going up from 163 million to 677 million francs. As a result of this additional library expenditure, 17 departments which had previously lacked a "bibliothèque centrale de pret in 1981 had acquired one by 1986. In addition, as a result of the Mauroy Government's library programme, 10 million more people obtained access to major lending library resources. As Paris' share of the cultural budget fell from 60% to 45% between 1981 and 1985, the provinces acquired new theatres, artistic centres, music halls, ballet companies, and popular culture facilities. During its first year in office, the Mauroy government increased spending on culture from 0.45% of the national budget to 0.75%, a figure which rose to 0.84% in 1984.

The incomes of the poorest sections of society were increased exponentially as a result of social security reforms and a 25% increase in the minimum wage. Allowances for the handicapped were also increased, while the right to deduct the cost of child care for all children under the age of three was introduced (a right later extended to include all children under the age of five in some cases). Unemployed workers ineligible for jobless benefits were given back the right to claim sickness insurance that they had lost in 1979 while the reimbursal of the costs of dental fees, hearing aids, and glasses was improved. An 80-franc-per-month charge that had been imposed on certain long-term illnesses was abrogated, and certain individuals who had retired before 1973 had the base upon which their pensions were calculated adjusted upward. Between 1981 and 1983, the minimum vieillesse (the basic pension benefit for the elderly poor) was raised by 62%.

To assist young farmers, the role of the SAFER (Societe d'Amenagemcnt Foncier et d'Etablissement Rural) was extended in 1982 to give preferential aid to this group to enlarge their holdings. Various measures were also introduced that helped to boost farmers' incomes. A partial price freeze instituted in June 1982 helped to limit the increase in production costs, while an income assistance programme (introduced in 1982 to compensate for a decline in farmers' incomes in 1981) contributed to a reduction in sectoral inequalities. In addition, an EEC price hike which the government negotiated in May 1982 represented an improvement over that of the previous year (11.2% compared with 10.3%). Consultative channels between farmers and government were also widened beyond the Federation Nationale des Syndicats d'Exploitants Agricoles (or FNSEA, the chief farming syndicat). In addition, the Mauroy Government had helped in the establishment of 12,000 farms with young farmers by mid-1983.

From 1982 onwards, all self-employed women in France were provided with a lump-sum maternity grant which may be supplemented by an income-replacement allowance. In 1983, the unemployment compensation programme was expanded to include workers who had resigned from their jobs. A law of July 1984 introduced a new benefit called the Insertion Allowance, providing short-term support for those in periods of transition into the labour market. Another law passed that same month introduced a Special Solidarity Allowance for long-term unemployed persons with no insurance entitlements remaining. In addition, an Act of October 1982 fully extended the right to join a union to people who were retired, and a law of February 1984 increased state support for the development and training activities of companies.

Although the Mauroy government's social policies improved the living standards of the less well-off in French society, its reflationary economic strategy (based on encouraging domestic consumption) failed to improve the French economy in the long term, with increases in the level of inflation as well as in the trade and budget deficits. Although the government's reflationary policies tended to stabilise unemployment, the number of people out of work topped 2 million, in spite of a pledge made by Mitterrand to keep it below this figure. A large budget deficit emerged, with social benefits and aid to industry alone going up by 50% in the 1982 budget. In addition, private investment failed to respond to the government's initiatives, with a 12% decline in volume in 1981. This led Mauroy to advocate the abandonment of Socialist economic policies (which failed to reduce unemployment and inflation), a controversial "U-turn" which was ratified by President Mitterrand in March 1983, and a number of austerity measures were carried out. In 1982, housing allowances were decoupled from the cost-of-living adjustment index. In 1982 and 1983, eligibility for unemployment benefits was tightened. A complex set of changes introduced in 1983 surrounding early retirement effectively reduced guarantees to full pensions for early retirees. Daily charges for hospital beds were introduced, while a variety of medical reimbursements were reduced. In September 1982, the indexation of wages and salaries in the public sector was abolished.

During the austerity period, the aim of the Socialists was limited to that of safeguarding the position of beneficiaries as far as possible and of giving special consideration to the poorest amongst them. While further increases in benefits for the elderly, the handicapped, and in some family allowances later became possible, extra costs were also imposed. For instance, the duration of unemployment benefits was reduced, while a basic hospital charge (with exemptions) was introduced, and contributions from the early retired and unemployed towards health care were demanded although, once again, the worse off were exempt. Austerity measures also led to efforts to restrain family costs while at the same time trying to safeguard priority groups. In February 1982, a 25% increase was made in allowances for families containing two eligible children, but some benefits were abandoned and the starting and finishing dates for eligibility altered. Later, cash increases were less than the amounts necessary to maintain the real value of family benefits except for the poorest groups in French society. The limits on income assessed for social insurance contributions were raised and the income base upon which employers and the self-employed were assessed for contributions was changed. The cost of support for handicapped adults was transferred to the national government, although some taxation on tobacco and alcohol was also earmarked for this purpose. A 1% tax on personal incomes was imposed (although the poorest 33% of taxpayers was excluded), and a 1% "solidarity" contribution levied on civil servants towards the cost of unemployment insurance. In spite of austerity, however, the real value of social protection made modest increases. Within the total, the greatest benefits was reserved for the poorest whilst income was raised in ways which saw a modest shift from traditional financing methods towards general community financing.

Failing to restrict the financing of private schools via the Savary Law, he resigned in 1984.

After Matignon

In 1988 he became First Secretary of the PS against the will of Mitterrand, who supported Laurent Fabius. Until the end of his term, in 1992, he tried to appease the relations between the factions which composed the PS, notably during the very strained 1990 Rennes Congress. He allied with the rocardien group and Lionel Jospin's supporters, who came from the mitterrandist group.

President of the Socialist International from 1992 to 1999, Senator since 1992, he left the Lille mayoralty in 2001. Considered a moral authority of the French Left, he supported the candidacy of Ségolène Royal during the 2007 primary election.

Political career

Governmental functions

Prime minister : 1981–1984.

Electoral mandates

European Parliament

Member of European Parliament : 1979–1980 (Resignation).

National Assembly of France

Member of the National Assembly of France for Nord (French department) (2nd, then 1st constituency from 1988 to 1992) : 1973–1981 (Became Prime minister in 1981) / 1984–1992 (Elected senator in 1992). Elected in 1973, reelected in 1978, 1981, 1984, 1986, 1988.

Senate of France

Senator of Nord (French department) : 1992–2011. Elected in 1992, reelected in 2001.

Regional Council

President of the Regional Council of Nord-Pas-de-Calais : 1974–1981.

Regional councillor of Nord-Pas-de-Calais : 1974–1981 / 1986–1988 (Resignation).

General Council

Vice-president of the General Council of Nord (French department) : 1967–1973.

General councillor of Nord (French department) : 1967–1973.

Municipal Council

Mayor of Lille : 1973–2001. Reelected in 1977, 1983, 1989, 1995.

Deputy-mayor of Lille : 1971–1973.

Municipal councillor of Lille : 1971–2008. Reelected in 1977, 1983, 1989, 1995, 2001.

Urban community Council

President of the Urban Community of Lille Métropole : 1989–2008. Reelected in 1995, 2001.

Vice-president of the Urban Community of Lille Métropole : 1971–1989. Reelected in 1977, 1983.

Member of the Urban Community of Lille Métropole : 1971–2008. Reelected in 1977, 1983, 1989, 1995, 2001.

Political function

First Secretary (leader) of the Socialist Party (France) : 1988–1992. Elected in 1988.

Mauroy's First Government, 21 May 1981 – 23 June 1981

Pierre Mauroy – Prime Minister
Claude Cheysson – Minister of External Relations
Charles Hernu – Minister of Defense
Gaston Defferre – Minister of the Interior and Decentralization
Jacques Delors – Minister of Economy
Pierre Joxe – Minister of Industry
Jean Auroux – Minister of Labour
Maurice Faure – Minister of Justice
Alain Savary – Minister of National Education
Jean Laurain – Minister of Veterans
Jack Lang – Minister of Culture
Édith Cresson – Minister of Agriculture
Michel Crépeau – Minister of Environment
André Henry – Minister of Free Time
Louis Mermaz – Minister of Transport and Equipment
Edmond Hervé – Minister of Health
Roger Quilliot – Minister of Housing
Georges Fillioud – Minister of Communication
Louis Mexandeau – Minister of Posts
Michel Rocard – Minister of Planning and Regional Planning
André Delelis – Minister of Commerce and Craft Industry
Michel Jobert – Minister of External Commerce
Jean-Pierre Chevènement – Minister of Research and Technology
Nicole Questiaux – Minister of National Solidarity
Louis Le Pensec – Minister of the Sea

Mauroy's Second Government, 23 June 1981 – 22 March 1983
Pierre Mauroy – Prime Minister
Claude Cheysson – Minister of External Relations
Charles Hernu – Minister of Defense
Gaston Defferre – Minister of the Interior and Decentralization
Jacques Delors – Minister of Economy
Catherine Lalumière – Minister of Consumption
Pierre Dreyfus – Minister of Industry
Jean Auroux – Minister of Labour
Marcel Rigout – Minister of Vocational Training
Robert Badinter – Minister of Justice
Alain Savary – Minister of National Education
Jean Laurain – Minister of Veterans
Jack Lang – Minister of Culture
Édith Cresson – Minister of Agriculture
Michel Crépeau – Minister of Environment
André Henry – Minister of Free Time
Charles Fiterman – Minister of Transport
Jack Ralite – Minister of Health
Roger Quilliot – Minister of Town Planning and Housing
Georges Fillioud – Minister of Communication
Louis Mexandeau – Minister of Posts
Michel Rocard – Minister of Planning and Regional Planning
André Delelis – Minister of Commerce and Craft Industry
Michel Jobert – Minister of External Commerce
Jean-Pierre Chevènement – Minister of Research and Technology
Nicole Questiaux – Minister of National Solidarity
Louis Le Pensec – Minister of the Sea

Changes
29 June 1982 – Jean-Pierre Chevènement succeeds Dreyfus as Minister of Industry. Pierre Bérégovoy succeeds Questiaux as Minister of National Solidarity, becoming also Minister of Social Affairs.

Mauroy's Third Government, 22 March 1983 – 17 July 1984
Pierre Mauroy – Prime Minister
Claude Cheysson – Minister of External Relations
Charles Hernu – Minister of Defense
Gaston Defferre – Minister of the Interior and Decentralization
Jacques Delors – Minister of Economy, Finance, and Budget
Laurent Fabius – Minister of Industry and Research
Marcel Rigout – Minister of Vocational Training
Robert Badinter – Minister of Justice
Alain Savary – Minister of National Education
Michel Rocard – Minister of Agriculture
Charles Fiterman – Minister of Transport
Roger Quilliot – Minister of Town Planning and Housing
Édith Cresson – Minister of Tourism and External Commerce
Michel Crépeau – Minister of Commerce and Craft Industry
Pierre Bérégovoy – Minister of Social Affairs and National Solidarity

Changes
4 October 1983 – Paul Quilès succeeds Quiliot as Minister of Town Planning and Housing.
18 December 1983 – Roland Dumas enters the Cabinet as Minister of European Affairs.

References

External links

Pierre Mauroy at the French Senate 

1928 births
2013 deaths
People from Nord (French department)
French Roman Catholics
Catholic socialists
French Section of the Workers' International politicians
Socialist Party (France) politicians
Chairmen of the Socialist Party (France)
Politicians from Lille
Grand Officiers of the Légion d'honneur
Grand Cross of the Ordre national du Mérite
Officers of the National Order of Quebec
Prime Ministers of France
Presidents of the Socialist International
Politicians of the French Fifth Republic
Commanders Crosses of the Order of Merit of the Federal Republic of Germany
Grand Cordons of the National Order of the Cedar
Mayors of Lille
Deaths from lung cancer in France
Senators of Nord (French department)